Northern Pwo, or Phlong, is a Karen language of Thailand. It is not intelligible with other varieties of Pwo, though it is close to Phrae Pwo. Northern Pwo consists of the mutually intelligible dialects of Mae Ping, Omkoi (Hod), and Mae Sarieng.

Distribution
Chiang Mai, Lamphun, and Tak provinces
Mae Hong Son province (15–25 villages): Mae Sarieng town, Mae Ngaw along Salween river, from Hot to Mae Sarieng.

References

Sources
Phillips, Audra. 2009. Lexical Similarity in Pwo Karen. In PYU Working Papers in Linguistics 5, Audra Phillips (ed.). Chiang Mai, Thailand: Payap University Linguistics Department.

Karenic languages